Sunrise Park is a  public park in Troutdale, Oregon, United States. The site previously served as a landfill.

References

External links

 
 Sunrise Park Shared Use Path Project, City of Troutdale, Oregon

Parks in Multnomah County, Oregon
Troutdale, Oregon